"Halloween Party" is the debut single released by special 2012 Halloween project unit Halloween Junky Orchestra, led by Hyde and K.A.Z from Vamps. The group contains over thirteen well-known Japanese musicians. It was released on October 17, 2012, in two CD+DVD versions and the limited edition includes a bonus booklet. The single debuted at #3 on the Oricon weekly singles chart. The single charted at #80 on the Oricon yearly singles chart for 2012 and is certified Gold in Japan.

Track listing

Personnel
 Hyde - Vocals, Lyrics, Production
 Acid Black Cherry - Vocals
 Daigo - Vocals
 Kyo - Vocals
 Tommy february6 - Vocals
 Tommy heavenly6 - Vocals
 Tatsurou - Vocals
 Anna Tsuchiya - Vocals
 Ryuuji Aoki - Vocals
 Kanon Wakeshima - Vocals
 Kaz - Guitar
 Hitsugi - Guitar
 Aki - Bass
 Rina Suzuki - Drums

Charts

Sales and certifications

Halloween Party (HALLOWEEN DOLLS)

HALLOWEEN DOLLS' composed of 15 vocalists and 5 dancers produced by HYDE covered "HALLOWEEN PARTY" . The CD containing this song was given as a free sample CD & DVD to kindergartens and nursery schools nationwide.

Halloween Party (HYDE)

This song was used for the opening of POUPELLE in Entotsu-machi, which was released on December 25, 2020.

Since it was arranged from the original song when it was used in the movie, it has the subtitle "-POUPELLE Ver.-". Based on the script and storyboards, the image of the town that is the subject of the movie is imaged, and the brass has an impressive industrial arrangement. In addition, some lyrics have been changed to match the content of the movie, and kids singers also participated.

References

Songs about parties
2012 singles
Avex Trax singles
Halloween songs
Songs written by Hyde (musician)
2012 songs
2015 songs
2020 songs